This was the first edition of the event.

Željko Franulović and Balázs Taróczy won the title, defeating Heinz Günthardt and Markus Günthardt 6–4, 4–6, 6–4 in the final.

Seeds

  Paolo Bertolucci /  Adriano Panatta (first round)
  Heinz Günthardt /  Markus Günthardt (final)
  Ángel Giménez /  Jairo Velasco Sr. (quarterfinals)
  Željko Franulović /  Balázs Taróczy (champions)

Draw

Draw

References
Draw

1980 in Swiss sport
1980 Grand Prix (tennis)
1980 Geneva Open